Acrocercops cordiella is a moth of the family Gracillariidae. It is known from Cuba.

The larvae feed on Cordia alba. They probably mine the leaves of their host plant.

References

cordiella
Moths of the Caribbean
Moths described in 1934
Endemic fauna of Cuba